In electronics, fall time (pulse decay time)  is the time taken for the amplitude of a pulse to decrease (fall) from a specified value (usually 90% of the peak value exclusive of overshoot or undershoot) to another specified value (usually 10% of the maximum value exclusive of overshoot or undershoot). 

Limits on undershoot and oscillation (also known as ringing and hunting) are sometimes additionally stated when specifying fall time limits.

See also 
Rise time
Transition time

References 

Transient response characteristics